Gaetano De Vescovi (14 November 1937 – 28 October 2017) was an Italian wrestler. He competed at the 1960 Summer Olympics and the 1964 Summer Olympics.

References

1937 births
2017 deaths
Italian male sport wrestlers
Olympic wrestlers of Italy
Wrestlers at the 1960 Summer Olympics
Wrestlers at the 1964 Summer Olympics
Sportspeople from Trieste
20th-century Italian people
21st-century Italian people